James J.Y. Liu (192626 May 1986) was an expert in Chinese literature research and Chinese literary theorists.

Biography
Liu graduated from the Department of Western Languages at Fu Jen Catholic University in 1948, and received a master's degree from the University of Bristol in 1952.

He taught Chinese and English literature at the University of London, University of Hong Kong, University of Hawaii, and the University of Pittsburgh. In 1967, he served as professor of Chinese literature at Stanford University. His main research was in the fields of Chinese classical poetry, poetry and literary theory, as well as Chinese and Western comparative literature and comparative poetics.

References

Chinese literary theorists
Catholic University of Peking alumni
Alumni of the University of Bristol
Stanford University faculty
Academics of the University of London
Academic staff of the University of Hong Kong
University of Hawaiʻi faculty
University of Pittsburgh faculty
1926 births
1986 deaths
People from Beijing